Fort Maidan, also known as Kota Maidanam, is a multi-use stadium in Palakkad, India.  It is currently used mostly for cricket matches.  The Fort Maidan holds a maximum capacity of 10,000 peoples at a time. 

Up till 2002 the ground was considered for local cricket only. In 2003, Ranji Trophy was introduced in Fort Maidan. Now Fort Maidan is a regular venue for first class cricket. Many famous state level cricket matches were held in this stadium.

References

Suburbs of Palakkad

External links

 Info on venue
 Cricketarchive

Sports venues in Kerala
Cricket grounds in Kerala
Buildings and structures in Palakkad district
Maidans in India
Sports venues completed in 2003
2003 establishments in Kerala